Barry King may refer to:

 Barry King (decathlete) (1945–2021), British decathlete
 Barry King (tennis) (born 1985), Irish tennis player